Bear Creek is a stream Clay County, in the U.S. state of Kentucky. It is a tributary of Red Bird River.

Bear Creek received its name after a bear was shot there, according to local history.

Tributaries and post offices 
Barcreek was established on 1900-03-07 by Elijah Herd, and remained in operation until March 1969.
It was half a mile upriver on Bear Creek from its confluence with the Red Bird River.
Its name was most likely a corruption of Bear Creek, but could also have been a reference to a large local sandbar.
Herd's first choice of his own name had been rejected by the USPS because it clashed with an already existing postoffice in Boyd County.

Green L. Langdon moved it upriver in 1914, close to, or possibly at, the site of what was later to be Spurlock post office. It was relocated back to Bear Creek in the 1920s, and was  up the creek when it closed.

Spurlock post office was established on 1928-10-02, Silvania Herd's first choice of "Herd" similarly being rejected by the USPS because it then clashed with an already existing postoffice by that name in Jackson County.
Named after the Spurlock family, descendants of settler William Spurlock (1815–1855) from North Carolina who had arrived at Bear Creek in 1835, it lasted until July 1988.
It was located 1 mile upstream of the mouth of Banks Branch, a tributary of Red Bird River to the south of Bear Creek, to replace Barcreek post office after it moved back to Bear Creek.

See also
List of rivers of Kentucky

Cross-reference

Sources

 
 

Rivers of Clay County, Kentucky
Rivers of Kentucky